Lajos Básti (17 November 1911 – 1 June 1977) was a Hungarian actor. He appeared in more than sixty films from 1935 to 1977.

Selected filmography

References

External links 

1911 births
1977 deaths
Hungarian male film actors
20th-century Hungarian male actors